Bruce Keech (born 8 October 1966) is an Australian former cyclist. He competed in the team time trial at the 1988 Summer Olympics.

References

External links
 

1966 births
Living people
Australian male cyclists
Olympic cyclists of Australia
Cyclists at the 1988 Summer Olympics
Place of birth missing (living people)